AMEK Kapsalou is a Cypriot association football club based in Kapsalos, Limassol. It has 7 participations in Cypriot Fourth Division.

References

Football clubs in Cyprus
Association football clubs established in 1956
1956 establishments in Cyprus